Nick C. Ellis is a Welsh psycholinguist. He is currently a professor of psychology and a research scientist at the English Language Institute of the University of Michigan. His research focuses on applied linguistics more broadly with a special focus on second language acquisition, corpus linguistics, psycholinguistics, emergentism, complex dynamic systems approaches to language, reading and spelling acquisition in different languages, computational modeling and cognitive linguistics.

Biography

Ellis received his Bachelor of Arts degree in psychology at the University of Oxford in 1974. He obtained a PhD degree in psychology at the University College of North Wales in 1978.

Between 1976 and 1991 he was a part-time Tutor at the Open University and between 1978 and 1990 a lecturer in psychology at the University College of North Wales. In 1990 he became a Senior Lecturer in Psychology at the University College of North Wales until 1994. In 1992 he was a visiting professor at the Temple University of Japan. Between 1994 and 1998 he was a Reader in Psychology at the University College of North Wales and between 1998 and 2004 a professor of psychology at the University of Wales Bangor.

He was the Editor, Language Learning between 1998 and 2002 and since 2006 he has been a General Editor of Language Learning.

In 2003 he became a visiting professor of Applied Language Studies and Linguistics at the University of Auckland in New Zealand. Since 2004 he has been a professor of psychology at the University of Michigan, Ann Arbor and a Research Scientist English Language Institute at the University of Michigan. Since 2004 he has been a Honorary Research Fellow at the School of Psychology University of Wales Bangor. He has been an Associate Faculty at the Center for the Study of Complex Systems, University of Michigan since 2008 and a professor of linguistics, University of Michigan, Ann Arbor since 2009. In 2011 he was a Visiting Researcher at the ESRC Centre for Research on Bilingualism, Bangor University. From May to June in 2011 he was the External Senior Fellow at the Freiburg Institute for Advanced Studies and in July in 2012 he became an Ian Gordon Fellow of the LALS, Victoria University, Wellington, New Zealand. In 2014 he received a Distinguished Visiting Lecturer title of the Temple University Japan and in 2016 he became an International Chair at Labex à Paris: Empirical Foundations of Linguistics.

Research
Ellis conducts research on several topics relating to second language acquisition, including the connection between explicit and implicit learning, reading, vocabulary and phraseology, applications of psychological theory in language testing and instruction, and the role of the brain. Ellis currently serves as general editor of the journal Language Learning.

References

External links
Nick Ellis's CV

Living people
University of Michigan faculty
21st-century American psychologists
Psycholinguists
Bilingualism and second-language acquisition researchers
Academic journal editors
1953 births
20th-century American psychologists